These are the results of the men's team all-around competition, one of eight events for male competitors in artistic gymnastics at the 1960 Summer Olympics in Rome.

Competition format

The gymnastics all-around events continued to use the aggregation format. Each nation entered a team of six gymnasts. All entrants in the gymnastics competitions performed both a compulsory exercise and a voluntary exercise for each apparatus. The top five individual scores in each exercise (that is, compulsory floor, voluntary floor, compulsory vault, etc.) were added to give a team score for that exercise. The 12 team exercise scores were summed to give a team total.

No separate finals were contested for the all-around events, though separate apparatus finals were added.

Exercise scores ranged from 0 to 10, apparatus scores from 0 to 20, individual totals from 0 to 120, and team scores from 0 to 600.

Results

References
 Official Olympic Report
 GymnasticsResults.com: Olympic results
 Gymn-Forum.net: Olympic results

Men's artistic team all-around
Men's events at the 1960 Summer Olympics